Ipomoea barbatisepala, commonly known as canyon morning glory, is a species of morning glory. It is native to the Southwestern United States, where it has been found in New Mexico and Arizona; in these regions, its native range overlaps with the non-native range of the closely related Ipomoea hederacea. It is also found in the west of Mexico.

Description 
The leaves are glabrous and deeply lobed, alternating on the stem. The flowers are blue or rarely white with a yellow center, usually appearing on the plant from July to December. The fruit is a capsule containing several dark seeds. The plant can be distinguished from the similar Ipomoea hederacea and Ipomoea cardiophylla by the leaf shape; while I. cardiophylla has heart-shaped leaves and I. hederacea has three-pointed leaves, I. barbatisepala has multi-lobed leaves.

References 

barbatisepala
Plants described in 1878